The 1957 election for Mayor of Los Angeles took place on April 2, 1957. Incumbent Norris Poulson was re-elected with minimal opposition. Poulson had stated that he would retire from the office before changing his mind and filing for re-election; County Supervisor Kenneth Hahn, President of the Los Angeles City Council John S. Gibson Jr., and advertising executive Don Belding all withdrew after Poulson made his announcement. Four candidates still ran to defeat Poulson, but Poulson won outright in the primary election.

Municipal elections in California, including Mayor of Los Angeles, are officially nonpartisan; candidates' party affiliations do not appear on the ballot.

Results

References and footnotes

External links
 Office of the City Clerk, City of Los Angeles

1957
Los Angeles
Los Angeles mayoral election
Mayoral election
Los Angeles mayoral election